I Wanna Dance is the second Japanese single by Super Junior's  sub-group, Donghae & Eunhyuk, released on June 19, 2013 by Avex Trax.

Lyrics
After an intro in English "Ladies and gentlemen i know you gonna dig this and the boys are back lets dance" the song lyrics commence: 
"寝ている場合じゃない neteiru baai janai オールナイトは無条件 all night wa mujouken お嬢さんtonight一緒に来ない？

Track listing

DVD
 "I Wanna Dance" music video
 "I Wanna Dance" music video (Dance ver.)
 "I Wanna Dance" music video making-of

Chart

References

External links
 Official Japanese Avex website of Super Junior Donghae & Eunhyuk
 Official Japanese Avex website of Super Junior

Super Junior songs
SM Entertainment singles
Avex Trax singles
2013 songs
2013 singles